Georgi Mitrov (born 5 November 1932) is a Bulgarian alpine skier. He competed in three events at the 1952 Winter Olympics.

References

1932 births
Living people
Bulgarian male alpine skiers
Olympic alpine skiers of Bulgaria
Alpine skiers at the 1952 Winter Olympics
Place of birth missing (living people)